Sorhagenia lophyrella is a moth in the family Cosmopterigidae. It is found in most of Europe, Asia Minor and the Caucasus.

Sorhagenia lophyrella resembles Sorhagenia rhamniella, but is distinguished by the slightly lighter front wings and the pale grey rear wings. A certain distinction is only possible from genitalic examination. Adults are on wing from in July in one generation per year.

The larvae feed on Rhamnus cathartica, Frangula alnus, Rhamnus pumila, Rhamnus saxatalis and sometimes also Rhamnus alpina and Rhamnus alaternus. They initially feed on the buds, but later feed between spun leaves. Larvae can be found from the beginning of April to the end of May. Pupation takes place on the ground.

References

External links
lepiforum.de

Moths described in 1846
Chrysopeleiinae
Moths of Europe
Moths of Asia